Antonio de Luca or Antonio De Luca may refer to:

Antonio De Luca (bishop) (1956–), Italian Catholic bishop
Antonio de Luca (artist) (1975–), Canadian artist